"Åh Amadeus" is a song written by Freddie Hansson and Peo Thyrén, and recorded by Lena Philipsson at her 1986 debut album "Kärleken är evig" This version peaked at Svensktoppen between 1 June-28 September 1986 and peaked at 7th position during a visit lasting for nine weeks. The song was also recorded by Uzbekistani singer Leyla and released as a single the same year.

The song's lyrics repeatedly invoke the help of Mozart in regaining the singer's lost love. In the refrain, the singer expresses her wish to have the "magic flute's magic" ("trollflöjtens magi"), a reference to Mozart's opera The Magic Flute (The opera's title in Swedish is Trollflöjten.)

References

1986 singles
Lena Philipsson songs
Swedish-language songs
1986 songs
Songs written by Peo Thyrén
Cultural depictions of Wolfgang Amadeus Mozart